Inderkum High School is an American public high school located in Sacramento, California, United States serving grades 9–12 in the Natomas Unified School District. It is an International Baccalaureate World School located in the northwestern neighborhoods of Sacramento.

History
Inderkum High School opened in 2004 with Ron Zimbalist as the principal and Darrin Slojkowski as the assistant principal. A few teachers from the first year remain. Its name comes from Frank Inderkum, a dairy farmer who owned the land the school is on. The mascot is a Tiger. School colors are blue and gold.

Inderkum’s non-charter feeder middle schools are Natomas Middle (partner MYP school), Heron K–8, and Paso Verde K-8. Students from Westlake Charter, Natomas Charter, Leroy Greene Academy, and Natomas Pacific Pathways Prep also feed into Inderkum. Each of the charters also continue into high school though some students opt to attend Inderkum.

Academics
Inderkum has housed the culminating International Baccalaureate Diploma Programme (DP) since 2012. The first class graduated in 2016. It is one of several high schools in the Sacramento area to offer this rigorous academic program. Students can either complete the full diploma by taking a certain battery of classes or pick and choose certain classes to take. The Middle Years Programme (MYP) is something that all freshman and sophomores participate in at Inderkum in addition to participating in their middle school years at Natomas Middle School.  Students who attend H. Allen Hight and Paso Verde will also participate in the primary years program during their elementary years. Natomas has the first TK–12 IB continuum in the entire Sacramento area.

The California Early College Academy started in the 2013/2014 school year. It is an opportunity for Inderkum students to take classes in 9th grade and 10th grade that prepare them to take classes at American River College in certain academic subjects during 11th and 12th grade. During the first five years, cohort sizes were 70 students per year. Beginning with the 2018–19 school year, cohort sizes are now 140 students.

Campus
In the July 30, 2013 issue of Best Education Degrees, there was an article entitled  "The 30 Most Amazing High School Campuses In The World.” Inderkum was placed #1 because of its buildings being highly energy efficient and uses electricity-generating photovoltaic panels, a geothermal ground loop system, low-velocity cooling displacement and radiant slab heating.

In 2008, the football stadium and track, officially known as Dave Tooker Stadium opened. Mr. Tooker was the superintendent of Natomas Unified when Inderkum opened. It is colloquially referred to the Home of the Tigers. During the summer of 2019, the stadium received a new all-weather field and an all new weather track.

On January 9, 2010, the 23,000 square feet library right next to campus.  It is a joint partnership between the Natomas Unified School District, the Los Rios Community College District, and the Sacramento County Public Library system. It is available for use during open library hours plus reserved at times with the school librarian. The roof of the library is shaped like an open book.

Athletics
During the second semester of 2008, Inderkum began the construction of a new $2.4 million turf football field and all-weather track for multiple uses, such as football, track, cross country, etc. The construction has since been completed, and is for private use. Inderkum participates in the Capital Valley Conference (Division 2) of the Sac Joaquin section.

The sports at Inderkum include: Basketball, Football(Most D1 signings in section since school opening in 2005), Cheerleading, Golf, Tennis, Track and field, Volleyball, Baseball, Cross Country, Soccer, Swimming, Wrestling, Water Polo and Softball. Many athletes have been signed from Inderkum into athletic scholarships.

Since 2007, Inderkum has been the undefeated league champions in football every year except for 2012. They were the league champions in 2012, simply not undefeated in league.

In 2006, Inderkum made the football playoffs for the first time and lost to Del Campo in the Semifinal round. Every year since then, they have made it into at least the 2nd round of the playoffs and have been in the third round or later of the playoffs every season since 2012. Furthermore, they have made it to the section championships 4 times and lost by 6 or fewer points each time to Casa Roble High School in overtime (2008), Del Campo High School (2009), and Oakdale High School (2014). They lost to defending state champions Del Oro High School in the 2016 section championship and lost to Del Oro again in 2017 at the quarter final level.

Notable alumni
Eric Pinkins (2009),  American football linebacker and safety for the San Diego Fleet of the Alliance of American Football (AAF)
 Elisse Joson, Filipino actress, model and endorser
Vince Mayle, American football tight end for the Los Angeles Chargers of the National Football League

Demographics
Today's Inderkum enrollment is made up of a diverse ethnic population of 2,150 students as of May 2019. The school is 25.4% Hispanic/Latino, 24.7% Asian/Filipino, 22.3% Black/African American, 15.5% White, 8.5% 2 or more races, 2.6% Native Hawaiian or Pacific Islander, and 0.5% Native Alaskan/Native American.

Inderkum Music Program
The Inderkum music program, led by Shawn Hines and Jemaline Hines, has over 350 members that are in the Concert Band, Symphonic Band, Wind Ensemble, Marching Band, Orchestra, Jazz Band, and Color Guard. It is the second largest extracurricular program at the school after the athletics program.

See also
Natomas Unified School District
List of high schools in California

References

External links
 Inderkum High School website

High schools in Sacramento County, California
Public high schools in California
International Baccalaureate schools in California
2004 establishments in California